Elbert Vernell Shelley (born December 24, 1964)  is a former football player who was a safety for the Atlanta Falcons. He went to the Pro Bowl four times as a special teams player.

Shelley's hometown is Trumann, Arkansas. He was an honor student as well as a star running back for the football team. In college Shelley was switched from running back to safety by Coach Larry Lacewell.

References

External links

1964 births
Living people
People from Poinsett County, Arkansas
American football safeties
Arkansas State Red Wolves football players
Atlanta Falcons players
National Conference Pro Bowl players
Players of American football from Arkansas